X-linked recessive hypoparathyroidism is a rare, congenital form of hypoparathyroidism.

Signs and symptoms 
The signs and symptoms of X-linked recessive hypoparathyroidism are characteristic of hypoparathyroidism and its consequent hypocalcemia. They include acute symptoms, like paresthesia, twitching of the hands and feet, unconsciousness, and trouble breathing; and chronic symptoms, including seizures, tiredness, irritability, cardiac insufficiency, abnormal heart rhythms, papilledema, cataracts, calcium deposits in the brain, and loss or brittleness of hair, skin, and nails.

Genetics 
This disease is named for its inheritance, which occurs in an x-linked recessive pattern.

Pathophysiology 
In this particular form of hypoparathyroidism, the parathyroid glands are underdeveloped and therefore do not produce enough parathyroid hormone. This is caused by a mutation on the x chromosome in the region of Xq26-27.

Diagnosis 
Hypoparathyroidism can be diagnosed using blood tests, the Chvostek sign, and the Trousseau sign. If comorbid conditions like congenital malformations, impaired growth, and intellectual disability are present, it may be a genetic form of hypoparathyroidism; the affected gene can be determined using a DNA test.

Treatment 
X-linked recessive hypoparathyroidism is treated like other forms of the disease, using calcium and vitamin D supplementation. Supplementation with parathyroid hormone is another treatment option.

References

External links 

Rare diseases
Endocrine diseases
Genetic diseases and disorders